Corn smut is a plant disease caused by the pathogenic fungus Ustilago maydis that causes smut on maize and teosinte. The fungus forms galls on all above-ground parts of corn species. It is edible, and is known in Mexico as the delicacy huitlacoche; which is eaten, usually as a filling, in quesadillas and other tortilla-based foods, and in soups.

Etymology 
In Mexico, corn smut is known as huitlacoche (sometimes spelled cuitlacoche). This word entered Spanish in Mexico from Classical Nahuatl, though the Nahuatl words from which huitlacoche is derived are debated. In modern Nahuatl, the word for huitlacoche is cuitlacochin, and some sources deem cuitlacochi to be the classical form.

Some sources wrongly give the etymology as coming from the Nahuatl words cuitlatl  ("excrement" or "rear-end", actually meaning "excrescence") and cochtli  ("sleeping", from cochi "to sleep"), thus giving a combined mismeaning of "sleeping/hibernating excrement", but actually meaning "sleeping excrescence", referring to the fact that the fungus grows in between the corns and impedes them from developing, thus they remain "sleeping".

A second group of sources deem the word to mean "raven's excrement". These sources appear to be combining the word cuitlacoche for "thrasher" with cuitla, meaning "excrement", actually meaning "excrescence". However, the avian meaning of cuitlacoche derives from the Nahuatl word "song" cuīcatl , itself from the verb "to sing" cuīca . This root then clashes with this reconstruction's second claim that the segment cuitla- comes from cuitla ("excrement").

One source derives the meaning as "corn excrescence", using cuītla again and "maize" tlaōlli . This requires the linguistically unlikely evolution of tlaōlli "maize" into tlacoche.

Taxonomy
U. maydis is the best known and studied of the Ustilaginomycetes, a sub class of basidiomycota, and so is often used as the exemplar species when talking about its entire class.

Characteristics 
The fungus infects all parts of the host plant by invading the ovaries of its host. The infection causes the corn kernels to swell up into tumor-like galls, whose tissues, texture, and developmental pattern are mushroom-like. The galls grow to 4 to 5 inches in diameter. These galls are made up of hypertrophied cells of the infected plant, along with resulting fungal threads, and blue-black spores. These dark-colored spores give the cob a burned, scorched appearance; this is the origin of the generic name Ustilago, from the Latin word ustilare (to burn).

Biology

Life cycle 

When grown in the lab on very simple media, it behaves like baker's yeast, forming single cells called sporidia. These cells multiply by budding off daughter cells. When two compatible sporidia meet on the surface of the plant, they switch to a different mode of growth. First, they produce one or another pheromone, and begin producing one or the other type of pheromone receptor - this depends on mating type a or b, as determined by alleles at two unlinked mating loci. If this signalling is successful they then send out conjugation tubes to find each other, after which they fuse and make a hypha to enter the maize plant. Hyphae growing in the plant are dikaryotic; they possess two haploid nuclei per hyphal compartment. In contrast to sporidia, the dikaryotic phase of U. maydis requires infection of the plant to grow and differentiate, and cannot be maintained in the laboratory.

Proliferation of the fungus inside the plant leads to disease symptoms such as chlorosis, anthocyanin formation, reduced growth, and the appearance of tumors harboring the developing teliospores.These teliospores help to overwinter the pathogen into the next season. They survive in the soil.

Mature tumors release spores that rain and wind then disperse. Under appropriate conditions, a metabasidium is formed in which meiosis occurs. Resulting haploid nuclei migrate into elongated single cells. These cells detach from the metabasidium to become the sporidia, thus completing the life cycle.

Host/pathogen conflict 
Plants have evolved efficient defense systems against pathogenic microbes. A rapid plant defense reaction after pathogen attack is the oxidative burst, which involves the production of reactive oxygen species at the site of the attempted invasion. As a pathogen, U. maydis can respond to such an oxidative burst by an oxidative stress response, regulated by gene YAP1. This response protects U. maydis from the host attack, and is necessary for the pathogen’s virulence. Furthermore, U. maydis has a well-established recombinational DNA repair system. This repair system involves a homolog of Rad51 that has a very similar sequence and size to its mammalian counterparts. This system also involves a protein, Rec2 that is more distantly related to Rad51, and Brh2 protein that is a streamlined version of the mammalian Breast Cancer 2 (BRCA2) protein. When any of these proteins is inactivated, sensitivity of U. maydis to DNA damaging agents is increased. Also mitotic recombination becomes deficient, mutation frequency increases and meiosis fails to complete. These observations suggest that recombinational repair during mitosis and meiosis in U. maydis may assist the pathogen in surviving DNA damage arising from the host’s oxidative defensive response to infection, as well as from other DNA damaging agents.

Proteome 
U. maydis is known to produce four Gα proteins, and one each of Gβ and Gγ.

Management 

There are many ways to control and manage corn smut; however, corn smut cannot be controlled by any common fungicide at this time, as Ustilago maydis infects individual corn kernels instead of infecting the entire cob, like head smut. Some beneficial ways to contain corn smut include resistant corn plants, crop rotation, and avoiding mechanical injury to the plant. A mechanical injury can cause the corn to become easily accessible to Ustilago maydis, enhancing infection. Additionally, clearing the planting area of debris can help control corn smut, as the teliospores from corn smut overwinter in debris. This is not the best practice, though, because corn smut can also overwinter in the soil; crop rotation is recommended. Lastly, as excess nitrogen in the soil augments infection rate, using fertilizer with low nitrogen levels, or just limiting the amount of nitrogen in the soil proves to be another way to control corn smut.

Environment 

Although not all the conditions that favor growth of Ustilago maydis are known, there are certain environments where corn smut seems to thrive, depending on both abiotic and biotic factors. Hot and dry weather during pollination followed by a heavy rainy season appear to improve the pathogenicity of corn smut. Furthermore, excess manure (and therefore nitrogen) in the soil also increases pathogenicity. Not only do these abiotic factors increase infectability, they also increase disease spread. High winds and heavy rain also increase disease spread as the spores of corn smut can be more easily transmitted. Other biotic factors largely have to do with the extent by which humans interact with the corn and corn smut. If corn debris is not cleared at the end of the season, the spores can overwinter in the corn fragments and live to infect another generation. Finally, humans wounding the corn (with shears or other tools of the like) present the opportunity for corn smut to easily enter the plant.

Uses

Model organism 
The yeast-like growth of U. maydis makes it an appealing model organism for research, although its relevance in nature is unknown. The fungus is exceptionally well-suited for genetic modification. This allows researchers to study the interaction between the fungus and its host with relative ease. The availability of the entire genome is another advantage of this fungus as model organism.

U. maydis is not only used to study plant disease, but it also is used to study plant genetics. In 1996, a study on U. maydis genetics led to the discovery of synthesis-dependent strand annealing, a method of homologous recombination used in DNA repair. Other studies in the fungus have also investigated the role of the cytoskeleton in polarized growth. It is largely due to work with U. maydis that the function of the breast-cancer gene BRCA2 is now known.
The fungus is mostly studied as model organism for host pathogen interaction and delivery of effectors protein

Industrial biotechnology 
Ustilago maydis is able to produce a broad range of valuable chemicals such as ustilagic acid, itaconic acid, malic acid, and hydroxyparaconic acid. With this ability it is gaining more and more relevance for industrial applications.

Culinary uses 

The fungus has had difficulty entering into the American and European diets as most farmers see it as blight, despite attempts by government and high-profile chefs to introduce it. In the mid-1990s, due to demand created by high-end restaurants, Pennsylvania and Florida farms were allowed by the United States Department of Agriculture (USDA) to intentionally infect corn with huitlacoche. Most observers consider the program to have had little impact, although the initiative is still in progress. The cursory show of interest is significant because the USDA has spent a considerable amount of time and money trying to eradicate corn smut in the United States. Moreover, in 1989, the James Beard Foundation held a high-profile huitlacoche dinner, prepared by Josefina Howard, chef at Rosa Mexicano restaurant.  This dinner tried to get Americans to eat more of it by renaming it the Mexican truffle and it is often compared to truffles in food articles describing its taste and texture.

Native Americans of the American Southwest, including the Zuni people, have used corn smut in an attempt to induce labor. It has similar medicinal effects to ergot, but weaker, due to the presence of the chemical ustilagine.

Recipes of Mexico 
A simple Mexican-style succotash can be made from chorizo, onions, garlic, serrano peppers, huitlacoche, and shrimp with salsa taquera. The mild, earthy flavors of the huitlacoche blend nicely with the fats of the chorizo and bond to mellow out the heat from the peppers and salsa.

Another Maya favorite on the Riviera Maya (Cancun to Tulum) is to add huitlacoche to omelettes. Once again, its earthy flavors bond with the fats that cook the eggs to mellow the flavors into a truffle-like taste.

Huitlacoche is also popular in quesadillas with Mexican cheese, sautéed onions, and tomatoes.

The blueish color transforms into the recognizable black color only with heat. Any dish with huitlacoche must include a slow simmer of the fungus until it becomes black, which also removes most of the starch of the corn, and what is left is a black oily paste.

Availability 
In Mexico, huitlacoche is mostly consumed fresh and can be purchased at restaurants or street or farmer's markets throughout the country and, to a much lesser extent, can also be purchased as a canned good in some markets and via the internet. Farmers in the countryside spread the spores around intentionally to create more of the fungus. In some parts of the country, they call the fungus "hongo de maiz", i.e. "maize fungus".

Nutritional value
When corn smut grows on a corn cob, it changes the nutritional worth of the corn it affects. Corn smut contains much more protein than regular corn does. The amino acid lysine, of which corn contains very little, abounds in corn smut.

See also

References

External links 

 U. maydis Genome at the Broad Institute
 MUMDB giving easy access to U. maydis genes

Edible fungi
Fungal plant pathogens and diseases
Maize diseases
Mexican cuisine
Ustilaginomycotina